The Sanctuary of Aphrodite Paphia was a sanctuary in ancient Paphos on Cyprus dedicated to the goddess Aphrodite. Located where the legendary birth of Aphrodite took place, it has been referred to as the main sanctuary of Aphrodite, and was a place of pilgrimages in the ancient world for centuries. The ruins of the sanctuary were inscribed on the UNESCO World Heritage List in 1980, due to their historical religious significance.

History
The site of Paphos was a holy place for the ancient Greeks, who believed it to be the place where Aphrodite landed when she rose from the sea. 
According to Pausanias (i. 14), her worship was introduced to Paphos from Syria, and from Paphos to Kythera in Greece.

The cult was likely of Phoenician origin. Archaeology has established that Cypriots venerated a fertility goddess before the arrival of the Greeks, and developed a cult that combined Aegean and eastern mainland aspects.  Before it was proved by archaeology it was understood that the cult of Aphrodite had been established before the time of Homer (c. 700 BC), as the grove and altar of Aphrodite at Paphos are mentioned in the Odyssey (viii. 362). 

Female figurines and charms found in the immediate vicinity date to the early third millennium BC.  The temenos (a piece of land marked off from common uses and dedicated to a god, a sanctuary, holy grove or holy precinct) was well established before the first structures were erected in the Late Bronze Age.

The sanctuary was closed during the persecution of pagans in the late Roman Empire in the 4th-century, and had at that time been in function for thousands of years since the Late Bronze Age: 
There was unbroken continuity of cult from that time until 391 AD when the Roman Emperor Theodosius I outlawed all pagan religions and the sanctuary fell into the ruins in which we find it today

Cult activity

Sanctuary of Aphrodite Paphia was the center of the worship of the goddess, not for Cyprus alone, but for the whole Aegean world. 

The Cinyradae, or descendants of Cinyras, of Phoenician origin but Greek by name, were the chief priests.  Their power and authority were very great; but it may be inferred from certain inscriptions that they were controlled by a senate and an assembly of the people. There was also an oracle here. Few cities have ever been so much sung and glorified by the poets.

Architecture

The sanctuary are depicted on many Roman coins from the Roman Imperial period from the reign of Vespasian as well as on earlier and later ones, and especially in the style on those of Septimius Severus.

The sanctuary was destroyed by an earthquake, but rebuilt by Vespasian.

Archeology

The remains of the vast sanctuary of Aphrodite are still discernible, its circumference marked by huge foundation walls.

Gustav Friedrich Hetsch, an architect of Copenhagen, has attempted to restore the building from the descriptions of coins as well as from archeological remains.

Contemporary mentions
The sanctuary is frequently referred to by ancient writers. 

The Homeric Hymns written between 7th-4th centuries B.C. and spuriously ascribed to Homer in antiquity mention the sanctuary in Hymn 5 to Aphrodite:
 She [Aphrodite] went to Kypros, to Paphos, where her precinct is and fragrant altar, and passed into her sweet-smelling temple.
Strabo described it:
 Palaipaphos [in Kypros], which last is situated at about ten stadia above the sea, has a mooring-place, and an ancient temple of Aphrodite Paphia. Then [beyond that] to the promontory Zephyria, with a landing-place, and to another Arsinoe, which likewise has a landing-place and a temple and a sacred precinct. And at a little distance from the sea is Hierokepis. Then to Paphos, which was founded by Agapenor, and has both a harbor and well-built temples. It is sixty stadia distant from Palaiphaphos by land; and on this road men together with women, who also assemble here from the other cities, hold an annual procession to Palaipaphos . . . Then [beyond that] to a city Soloi, with a harbor and a river and a temple of Aphrodite and Isis.
Pausanias described the shrine: 
 After the capture of Troy the storm that overtook the Greeks on their return home carried Agapenor and the Arkadian fleet to Kypros, and so Agapenor became the founder of Paphos, and built the sanctuary of Aphrodite at Palaipaphos (Old Paphos). Up to that time the goddess had been worshipped by the Kyprians in the district called Golgoi.
Tacitus described the altar and aniconic black stone worshipped at the sanctuary as the simulacrum of Venus:
 Blood may not be shed upon the altar, but offering is made only with prayers and pure fire. The altar is never wet by any rain, although it is in the open air. The representation of the goddess is not in human form, but it is a circular mass that is broader at the base and rises like a turning-post to a small circumference at the top. The reason for this is obscure. 
It was also referred to by Apuleius in The Golden Ass:
 You [Aphrodite] are venerated at the wave-lapped shrine of Paphos.

References

 Richard Maguire, Jane Chick, Approaching Cyprus: Proceedings of the Post-Graduate Conference of Cypriot 

Temples of Aphrodite
Paphos